The Rolls-Royce RB.141 Medway was a large low-bypass turbofan engine designed, manufactured and tested in prototype form by Rolls-Royce in the early-1960s. The project was cancelled due to changes in market requirements that also led to the development and production of the smaller but similar Rolls-Royce Spey, and the cancellation of the Armstrong Whitworth AW.681 military transport aircraft project.

Design and development
Designed by a team led by Alan Arnold Griffith, the RB.141 was originally designed to meet a new propulsion requirement for the de Havilland DH.121 airliner project which later became the Hawker Siddeley Trident. The engine was later named after the River Medway in line with Rolls-Royce company tradition for jet engines. The DH.121 itself was being designed to a requirement and specification from British European Airways issued in February 1958, and when this requirement was altered to that of a smaller aircraft, the Medway in its initial form was no longer needed.

As a considerable amount of company funds had already been spent on development, the project was continued to rework the design for another future aircraft project, the Armstrong Whitworth AW.681 VTOL military transport aircraft. The rear section of the engine was modified to incorporate an internal thrust deflector to duct exhaust gases through swivelling nozzles; an idea similar to that used on the contemporary Bristol Siddeley Pegasus. Cancellation of the AW.681 project however also brought to an end further development work on the Medway with attention turning to the smaller, but very closely related, Spey turbofan, the Spey being basically a scaled-down Medway incorporating more recent technical developments.

Another possible application for the Medway was the Saab 37 Viggen, but a lack of British government funding was stated as the reason for the cancellation of this order.

By December 1963 the Medway had successfully completed over 1,700 hours of bench running.

Variants
RB.140
  thrust, early development engine
RB.141 Medway
Variant for DH.121 airliner use 
RB.142 Medway
Vectored thrust development for the AW.681.
RB.174 Medway
Advanced civil development
RB.177 Medway
Advanced military development of ~15,000 lb st dry, proposed for the Saab 37 Viggen

Projected applications

Armstrong Whitworth AW.681
Bristol Type 200
de Havilland DH.121
Saab 37 Viggen
Sud Aviation Super Caravelle
Vickers VC10

Specifications (RB.141-3 Medway)

See also

References

Notes

Bibliography

 Gunston, Bill. World Encyclopedia of Aero Engines. Cambridge, England. Patrick Stephens Limited, 1989.

External links
 Thrust SSC - Medway/Spey development

Low-bypass turbofan engines
Medway
1950s turbofan engines